Yuxarı Qəsil (also, Juxari Qəsil and Yukhary Kasil’) is a village and municipality in the Agdash Rayon of Azerbaijan.  It has a population of 1,705.

References 

Populated places in Agdash District